Christopher Pugilese is an American realist artist.  He studied at the New York Academy of Art under Ted Jacobs and Tony Ryder. After that he continued his education as an artist at the Art Students League and the National Academy of Design both in New York City.  He also studied privately in France with Seth Jacobs.

Pugliese's work has been exhibited at the Eleanor Ettinger, John Pence, Capro Nason, Arcadia, Hirschl and Adler and Bellwether galleries.
In 2010 the New Britain Museum of American Art held of retrospective of his work as part of their "New/Now" series.

Inspiration
The son of two modern artists Richard and Virginia Pugliese, Christopher grew up in Soho, NYC during the 1980s. Although surrounded by Modern Art objects, he was drawn instead to the paintings of the old masters, which had been out of fashion in the New York art world since the 1940s. Recently these works have begun to be reevaluated.

Solo exhibitions

Selected group exhibitions

Collections

Selected bibliography

Awards

Education

References

Living people
20th-century American painters
Year of birth missing (living people)
21st-century American painters